"Cities on Flame with Rock and Roll" is the debut single by American hard rock band Blue Öyster Cult from their eponymous debut album Blue Öyster Cult. Despite not charting, it has become a staple at concerts, and is regarded as one of their most famous songs (featured on their greatest hits album). Its demo is credited with getting the band signed with Columbia Records. Lead vocals were performed by their drummer, Albert Bouchard. The lyrics of the song describe the devastation of a nuclear war with metaphors likening the destruction to rock and roll music.

Cash Box called it a "hard driving, heavy metal rocker will be immediately attractive to both AM and FMers looking to put some life into their playlists."

The song was further brought to prominence when it was featured in Guitar Hero III: Legends of Rock. It was also featured on the soundtrack of That '70s Show.

Personnel 
Eric Bloom – stun guitar
Albert Bouchard – vocals, drums
Joe Bouchard – bass
Allen Lanier – keyboards
Buck Dharma – lead guitar

Cover versions
The song has been covered by Church of Misery (on Master of Brutality), Iced Earth (on Tribute to the Gods) and 3 Inches of Blood (as a bonus track on Here Waits Thy Doom).

References

1972 debut singles
1972 songs
Blue Öyster Cult songs
Columbia Records singles
Songs about nuclear war and weapons